An All-American team is an honorary sports team composed of the best amateur players of a specific season for each team position—who in turn are given the honorific "All-America" and typically referred to as "All-American athletes", or simply "All-Americans".  Although the honorees generally do not compete together as a unit, the term is used in U.S. team sports to refer to players who are selected by members of the national media.  Walter Camp selected the first All-America team in the early days of American football in 1889.  The 2012 NCAA Men's Basketball All-Americans are honorary lists that include All-American selections from the Associated Press (AP), the United States Basketball Writers Association (USBWA), the Sporting News (TSN), and the National Association of Basketball Coaches (NABC) for the 2011–12 NCAA Division I men's basketball season.  All selectors choose at least a first and second 5-man team. The NABC, TSN and AP choose third teams, while AP also lists honorable mention selections.

The Consensus 2012 College Basketball All-American team is determined by aggregating the results of the four major All-American teams as determined by the National Collegiate Athletic Association (NCAA).  Since United Press International was replaced by TSN in 1997, the four major selectors have been the aforementioned ones.  AP has been a selector since 1948, NABC since 1957 and USBWA since 1960.  To earn "consensus" status, a player must win honors based on a point system computed from the four different all-America teams. The point system consists of three points for first team, two points for second team and one point for third team. No honorable mention or fourth team or lower are used in the computation.  The top five totals plus ties are first team and the next five plus ties are second team.

Although the aforementioned lists are used to determine consensus honors, there are numerous other All-American lists.  The ten finalists for the John Wooden Award are described as Wooden All-Americans.  The ten finalists for the Lowe's Senior CLASS Award are described as Senior All-Americans.  Other All-American lists include those determined by Fox Sports, and Yahoo! Sports.  The scholar-athletes selected by College Sports Information Directors of America (CoSIDA) are termed Academic All-Americans.

2012 Consensus All-America team
The following players are recognized as the 2012 Consensus All-Americans:
PG – Point guard
SG – Shooting guard
PF – Power forward
SF – Small forward
C – Center

Individual All-America teams

By player

By team

AP Honorable Mention:

Harrison Barnes, North Carolina
Will Barton, Memphis
Julian Boyd, LIU Brooklyn
Ryan Broekhoff, Valparaiso
De'Mon Brooks, Davidson
Trey Burke, Michigan
Deonte Burton, Nevada
Torrey Craig, S.C.-Upstate
Paul Crosby, Mississippi Valley State
Matthew Dellavedova, Saint Mary's
LaRon Dendy, Middle Tennessee
Matt Dickey, UNC Asheville
Jamaal Franklin, San Diego State
Jorge Gutierrez, California
John Henson, North Carolina
Robbie Hummel, Purdue
Pierre Jackson, Baylor
Darius Johnson-Odom, Marquette
Perry Jones III, Baylor
Kris Joseph, Syracuse
Jeremy Lamb, Connecticut
Scott Machado, Iona
CJ McCollum, Lehigh
Dominique Morrison, Oral Roberts
Mike Moser, UNLV
Andrew Nicholson, St. Bonaventure
Kyle O'Quinn, Norfolk State
Darryl Partin, Boston University
Ryan Pearson, George Mason
Mason Plumlee, Duke
Patrick Richard, McNeese State
Austin Rivers, Duke
Zack Rosen, Pennsylvania
Mike Scott, Virginia
John Shurna, Northwestern
Jordan Taylor, Wisconsin
Dion Waiters, Syracuse
Casper Ware, Long Beach State
Mitchell Watt, Buffalo
Royce White, Iowa State
Isaiah Wilkerson, NJIT
Nate Wolters, South Dakota State
Cody Zeller, Indiana

Academic All-Americans
On February 23, 2012, CoSIDA and Capital One announced the 2012 Academic All-America team, with Tyler Zeller headlining the University Division as the men's college basketball Academic All-American of the Year.  The following is the 2011–12 Capital One Academic All-America Men's Basketball Team (University Division) as selected by CoSIDA:

Senior All-Americans
The ten finalists for the Lowe's Senior CLASS Award are called Senior All-Americans.  The 10 honorees are as follows:

Notes

All-Americans
NCAA Men's Basketball All-Americans